John William Kneller, OAP (October 15, 1916 – July 2, 2009) was an English-American French language professor and scholar, and the fifth President of Brooklyn College.

Biography
Kneller was born in Oldham, England, to John W. Kneller and Margaret Ann Truslove. He had four older brothers. He immigrated to Worcester, Massachusetts, when he was five years old.  He later became a U.S. citizen.

He studied at Clark University (B.A.; 1938) and Yale University (M.A., 1948 and Ph.D. in French, 1950). Kneller was a Fulbright Scholar in French literature at the University of Paris in 1949-50. In June 1970 Clark University conferred upon him the degree of Doctor of Letters, Honoris Causa, "in recognition of his fine accomplishments as a teacher, scholar, and administrator and in gratitude for his wise counsel on behalf of the trustees and faculty of Clark University."

During World War II, Kneller was a translator for the United States Army Air Corps. He served at Camp Ritchie in Maryland and was part of the Military Intelligence Training Center classifying him as one of the Ritchie Boys.

Kneller taught at Oberlin College, where starting in 1950 he was a French instructor, professor, department chair, dean of the College of Arts and Sciences, and then provost.

He was the fifth President of Brooklyn College from 1969 to 1979. Kneller brought along his horse from Oberlin, and would ride it in Prospect Park. Students occupied his office at the college during a student strike after the Kent State shootings and the Cambodian Campaign in 1970.  He terminated classes, but kept campus buildings open for students and faculty. A member of the Brooklyn College Fencing Team introduced streaking to the college in 1974, dashing across the Quad.

From 1979-1995 Kneller taught French literature at Hunter College and the CUNY Graduate Center. He was co-chair of the Henri Peyre Institute for the Humanities at the CUNY Graduate Center, and Managing Editor and Editor-in-Chief of the French Review. In 1999, the French government awarded him its highest rank -- Commandeur in the Ordre des Palmes Academiques (Order of Academic Palms).

He was married for 61 years to Alice Bowerman Hart. They had a daughter, Linda Hart Kneller.

Kneller died at 92 years of age on July 2, 2009, at his home in Westport, New York.

References 

People from Westport, New York
People from Oldham
1916 births
American academic administrators
Brooklyn College faculty
Yale University alumni
Clark University alumni
University of Paris alumni
Oberlin College faculty
Hunter College faculty
Graduate Center, CUNY faculty
United States Army Air Forces personnel of World War II
Ritchie Boys
People from Worcester, Massachusetts
2009 deaths
Presidents of Brooklyn College
British expatriates in France
British emigrants to the United States
20th-century American academics